Cuban Colony is an Indian Malayalam language  action comedy film written and directed by Manoj Varghese Parecattil, with Able Benny, Jino John, SreeRaj Vikram, Sreekanth Dasan, Gokul GK and Aiswarya Unni in lead roles under the banner of HalyAnnGroup. The film is predominantly set in Angamaly.

Cast
 Jino John as Charli 
 Sreekanth Dasan as Sambu
 Able Benny as Martin chako
 Aristo Suresh as Aristo
 Sreeraj vikram as Bibi 
 Gk Gokul As Messi
 Manoj Varghese Parecattil As Anil
 Kripesh Kannan as Jango
 Aiswarya Unni as Anu Varghese  
 Anagha as Mariya

Music
The film score is composed, arranged by Aloshya Kavumpurathu and lyrics written by Hari Narayanan and Manoj Varghese Parecattil.

Release
Cuban Colony was released on 6 July 2018 (India).

References

External links

2018 films
Indian action comedy films
2010s Malayalam-language films
2018 action comedy films